Only the Silence Remains is a 1975 album by Canadian singer-songwriter Murray McLauchlan.  It was released as a double album. McLauchlan is accompanied by Dennis Pendrith on bass guitar. True North re-released it as a Digital Download in 2012.

Track listing

Personnel
Murray McLauchlan – vocals, guitar, harmonica, piano
Dennis Pendrith – bass
Technical
Bill Siddon, Al Feeney - engineer
Bart Schoales – photography, artwork

References

Murray McLauchlan albums
1975 live albums
True North Records albums